Christopher is an unincorporated community in Newton County, in the U.S. state of Missouri.

History
A post office called Christopher was established in 1885, and remained in operation until 1907. Besides the post office, the community had a school, the Christopher School, now defunct. The schoolhouse was named after the Christopher family of settlers.

References

Unincorporated communities in Newton County, Missouri
Unincorporated communities in Missouri